SN 2008D is a supernova detected with NASA's Swift X-ray telescope. The explosion of the supernova precursor star, in the spiral galaxy NGC 2770 (88 million light years away (27 Mpc), was detected on January 9, 2008, by Carnegie-Princeton fellows Alicia Soderberg and Edo Berger, and Albert Kong and Tom Maccarone independently using Swift.  They alerted eight other orbiting and ground-based observatories to record the event. This was the first time that astronomers have ever observed a supernova as it occurred.

The supernova was determined to be of Type Ibc. The velocities measured from SN2008D indicated expansion rates of more than 10,000 kilometers per second. The explosion was off-center, with gas on one side of the explosion moving outward faster than on the other. This was the first time the X-ray emission pattern of a supernova (which only lasted about five minutes) was captured at the moment of its birth. Now that it is known what X-ray pattern to look for, the next generation of X-ray satellites is expected to find hundreds of supernovae every year exactly when they explode, which will allow searches for neutrino and gravitational wave bursts that are predicted to accompany the collapse of stellar cores and the birth of neutron stars.

See also

 List of supernovae
 History of supernova observation
 List of supernova remnants
 List of supernova candidates

References

External links
 Light curves and spectra  on the Open Supernova Catalog

20080109
Supernovae
Lynx (constellation)